Free State (formerly Orange Free State) is the first-class cricket team representing the province of Free State (known as Orange Free State until 1995) in South Africa. For the purposes of the SuperSport Series, Free State merged with Griqualand West and formed the Eagles cricket team franchise. The team was called Orange Free State from January 1904 to April 1995; it has been part of the Eagles from October 2004.

Honours

 Currie Cup (3) – 1992–93, 1993–94, 1997–98 ; shared (0) – 
 Standard Bank Cup (4) – 1988–89, 1993–94, 1994–95, 1995–96
 South African Airways Provincial Three-Day Challenge (0) – 
 South African Airways Provincial One-Day Challenge (1) – 2004–05
 Gillette/Nissan Cup (2) – 1991–92, 1992–93

Venues
Venues have included:
 Ramblers Cricket Club Ground, Bloemfontein (Jan 1904 – Feb 1986)
 South African Railways Club Old Ground, Bloemfontein (Jan 1938 – Dec 1939)
 Welkom Mines Recreation Ground (occasional venue Nov 1954 – Nov 1963)
 University of Orange Free State Ground, Bloemfontein (Oct 1986 – Dec 1993)
 Harmony Gold Mine Cricket Club A Ground, Virginia (four matches Nov 1986 – Sept 1991)
 Goodyear Park, Bloemfontein (Oct 1989–present)
 Rovers Cricket Club, Welkom (two games 1981 – 1985)

Squad
In April 2021, Cricket South Africa confirmed the following squad ahead of the 2021–22 season.

 Mbulelo Budaza
 Gerald Coetzee
 Patrick Kruger
 Wandile Makwetu
 Migael Pretorius
 Jacques Snyman
 Pite van Biljon
 Raynard van Tonder
 Farhaan Behardien
 Patrick Botha
 Matthew Kleinveldt
 Gregory Mohlokwana
 Mangaliso Mosehle
 Alfred Mothoa
 Dilivio Ridgaard
 Nealan van Heerden

References

Sources
 South African Cricket Annual – various editions
 Wisden Cricketers' Almanack – various editions

South African first-class cricket teams
Cricket in the Free State (province)